Semagystia bucharana is a moth in the family Cossidae. It was described by Andreas Bang-Haas in 1910. It is found in Uzbekistan and Kazakhstan.

References

Cossinae
Moths described in 1910